Abigail Reynolds (b. 1975)is a British artist who lives in St Just, Cornwall, and has a studio at Porthmeor in St Ives.

Biography 
Based in Cornwall, United Kingdom, Reynolds studied at St Catherine's College, Oxford,  Chelsea College of Arts, and Goldsmiths University. In March 2016 she was awarded the BMW Art Journey prize at Art Basel, to travel to lost libraries along the Silk Road. In 2020 she received a Paul Hamlyn Foundation award for visual art. She is one of 47 artists selected for British Art Show 9 touring 2021-22.

Career 
In 2016 Reynolds was awarded the BMW Art Journey prize at Art Basel. As the third artist to take a BMW Art Journey, Reynolds spent five months visiting fifteen locations along the ancient Silk Road, filming historic library sites in Italy, Egypt, Turkey, Uzbekistan, Iran and China. She used a Bolex camera and 16mm film. Reynolds’ book titled Lost Libraries detailing her journey, was published by Hatje Cantz in Nov 2017.

In 2016, Reynolds was awarded an Arts Council England Grant to produce her first film work ‘The Mother’s Bones’. From 2012-14, Reynolds was the inaugural artist-in-residence at Rambert Dance Company, London.

In 2022 Reynolds was commissioned to make a permanent artwork for Kresen Kernow the Cornish archive. Her window,Tre celebrates the narratives woven into the Cornish landscape over time. 

Reynolds has played an active role supporting the arts in Cornwall. She was commissioned by Tate St Ives to create a work to mark the opening of TSI2 (October 2017). This was a live work titled We Beat The Bounds.

Reynolds has work in the Arts Council Collection, the Government Art Collection, Yale University Art Gallery, New York Public Library and many private collections. She is represented by Michael Hoppen Gallery in London.

Personal life 
Having lived in Oxford and London, Reynolds moved to St Just in Penwith in 2004 with her partner Andy Harper and their two children. In 2014 she was offered one of the 19 studios in the iconic Porthmeor studios in St Ives, and continues to work there.

Lecturing 
After lecturing for five years in contextual studies for the Fine Art program at Chelsea College of Art and Design in London, Reynolds taught in the sculpture department at the Ruskin School of Drawing and Fine Art, Oxford University from 2003-2010. This included curating a year-long interdisciplinary talks series titled ‘Doubt’ funded by the Gulbenkian Foundation.

References

External links
 Official website
 British Art Show 9
 The Serving Library: Lost Libraries

Living people
1975 births
21st-century British women artists
Alumni of Chelsea College of Arts 
Alumni of Goldsmiths, University of London
Alumni of St Catherine's College, Oxford
British contemporary artists
British women sculptors
St Ives artists